Mount Gniewek is a conspicuous ice-covered flat-topped mountain,  high, standing at the north side of Carlyon Glacier,  southwest of Mount Keltie in Antarctica. It was mapped by the United States Geological Survey from tellurometer surveys and Navy air photos, 1959–63, and was named by the Advisory Committee on Antarctic Names for John J. Gniewek, a geomagnetician at Little America V, 1958.

References

Mountains of Oates Land